This is a comparison of widget engines.  This article is not about widget toolkits that are used in computer programming to build graphical user interfaces.

General

Operating system support

Technical

Languages
Which programming languages the engines support. Most engines rely upon interpreted languages.

Formats and Development

Development Tools
As widgets are largely combinations of HTML or XHTML, CSS, and Javascript in most cases, standard AJAX tools, such as Eclipse ATF, can be used for development. Specialized tools may give access to additional capabilities supplied by frameworks such as Dojo or Openrico.

References

Widget engines
Widget Engines